Nikos Katsikokeris (born 19 June 1988) is a Greek professional footballer who plays as a forward for Gamma Ethniki club Giouchtas F.C.

Club career
Katsikokeris began his professional career with Panetolikos at the age of 17. He then played for Tilikratis and Keratsini in the Delta Ethniki, the fourth tier of the Greek football league system. In 2009, he went to Platanias, a Cretan club playing in the Greek Football League 2, where he scored 19 goals in 58 games. His good performances did not go unnoticed, and in the summer of 2011, Katsikokeris signed for Ergotelis, a fellow Cretan club playing in the Greek Superleague. Katsikokeris impressed with his performances with Ergotelis, coming straight from the third division to score 7 goals in 27 Superleague games, thus drawing the attention of struggling Greek giants AEK Athens, who bought Katsikokeris from Ergotelis in the summer of 2012 for a reported 150K euros. On 16 September 2012, he made his debut for AEK against Skoda Xanthi.

After AEK was relegated at the end of the season, Katsikokeris signed at Panthrakikos on 14 August 2013. As he was not considered between his manager's primary choices, Katsikokeris left the club in 2014, and has since returned to Crete and the Gamma Ethniki, after a brief stay with Panegialios in the Football League.

After a distinguished performance with Cretan club Ermis Zoniana in the 2015–16 Gamma Ethniki season, in which he scored 16 goals in 25 matches, Katsikokeris returned to Ergotelis once again in the summer of 2016, this time determined to help his former club return to top flight after being relegated to the Gamma Ethniki. He did so by scoring 18 goals in 27 matches during the 2016−17 Gamma Ethniki season, finishing top-scorer of Group 4 for the second time in his career since his feats with Platanias in 2011. His stay at the club was abruptly ended due to uncertainty on whether the club would secure the required funds to actually promote to the Football League after securing the Division title, and therefore Katsikokeris chose to continue his career with Gamma Ethniki side Ethnikos Piraeus. He finished third top-scorer in the Group 6 Table with 7 goals in 18 matches, contributing to Ethnikos' first-place finish and subsequent qualification to the promotion play-offs. Katsikokeris scored an additional three goals in six games during the play-offs, but Ethnikos failed to promote to the Football League.

In July 2018, Katsikokeris moved back to Crete and signed a contract with newly promoted Gamma Ethniki club Episkopi.
After Episkopi, joined for two seasons club Ierapetra. Now he is playing for Gamma Ethniki club Giouchtas.

References

External links
 
Onsports Profile
Guardian Profile

1988 births
Living people
Greek footballers
Super League Greece players
Panetolikos F.C. players
Platanias F.C. players
Ergotelis F.C. players
AEK Athens F.C. players
Panthrakikos F.C. players
Panegialios F.C. players
Panargiakos F.C. players
Ethnikos Piraeus F.C. players
Association football forwards
Footballers from Amfilochia